David Stephenson (born 6 October 1972) is an English professional rugby league footballer who played in the 1990s and 2000s.

He started his career with Milford Marlins and Queens when he represented Great Britain under 18/s against the Australian schoolboys in 1991 winning the man of the match award.

He played an off-season in Australia in 1993, with Barrie McDermott, for Wyong Roos.

A tough uncompromising player who was a fans favourite at each club he played at.

After retiring he returned to his first junior club Milford Marlins coaching

External links
 Statistics at rugbyleagueproject.org
 Statistics at orl-heritagetrust.org.uk
  (archived by web.archive.org) Statistics at hullfc.com
  (archived by web.archive.org) Stats → Past Players → S at hullfc.com

1972 births
Living people
English rugby league players
Hull F.C. players
Oldham R.L.F.C. players
Rochdale Hornets players
Rugby league hookers
Rugby league locks
Rugby league players from Leeds
Rugby league props
Rugby league second-rows